The 1977 Stanley Cup Finals was the championship series of the National Hockey League's (NHL) 1976–77 season, and the culmination of the 1977 Stanley Cup playoffs. It was contested between the Boston Bruins and the defending champion Montreal Canadiens. The Bruins were making their first appearance in the final series since their loss in the 1974 Final. The Canadiens would win the best-of-seven series four games to none, to win their second straight Stanley Cup championship, and 20th overall.

Paths to the Finals
Montreal defeated the St. Louis Blues 4–0 and the New York Islanders 4–2 to advance to the final.

Boston defeated the Los Angeles Kings 4–2 and the Philadelphia Flyers 4–0 to make it to the final.

Game summaries
Jacques Lemaire scored three game-winning goals, including the Cup-winner in overtime. Guy Lafleur won the Conn Smythe Trophy for scoring nine goals and 17 assists during the playoffs.

Team rosters

Boston Bruins

|}

Montreal Canadiens

|}

Stanley Cup engraving
The 1977 Stanley Cup was presented to Canadiens captain Yvan Cournoyer by NHL President Clarence Campbell following the Canadiens 2–1 overtime win over the Bruins in game four.

The following Canadiens players and staff had their names engraved on the Stanley Cup

1976–77 Montreal Canadiens

See also
 1976–77 NHL season

References

 
 

Stanley Cup
Stanley Cup Finals
Boston Bruins games
Montreal Canadiens games
Ice hockey competitions in Montreal
Ice hockey competitions in Boston
Stanley Cup Finals
1970s in Montreal
Stanley Cup Finals
Stanley Cup Finals
Stanley Cup Finals